Mis'da Mustafa Mohammad Ramounieh (born 25 May 1983) is a Jordanian footballer who plays as a goalkeeper. She has captained both Jordanian side Orthodox Club and the Jordan women's national team.

International career
Ramounieh was barred from competing at the 2012 AFC Women's Olympic Qualifying Tournament as she wears hijab.

See also
List of Jordan women's international footballers

References

1983 births
Living people
People with acquired Jordanian citizenship
Jordanian women's footballers
Women's association football goalkeepers
Jordan women's international footballers
Jordanian Muslims
Footballers at the 2006 Asian Games
Footballers at the 2010 Asian Games
Asian Games competitors for Jordan
American Muslims
American soccer players
American people of Jordanian descent